Cody Callum Pierre Drameh (born 8 December 2001) is an English professional footballer who plays as a full back for Luton Town, on loan from Leeds United.

Club career
Drameh was born in Dulwich. After playing youth football for Fulham, Drameh signed for Leeds United in August 2020. On 26 October 2021, Drameh made his professional debut for Leeds United, starting in a 2–0 defeat at Arsenal in the EFL Cup fourth round. Five days later he made his Premier League debut for Leeds in the 2–1 win against Norwich City as a second half substitute for Jamie Shackleton.

On 12 January 2022, Drameh joined Championship side Cardiff City on loan for the remainder of the 2021–22 season. He made his debut for Cardiff on 15 January 2022 in the starting line-up for the 1-0  league loss to Blackburn Rovers. He was named as the Welsh side's Young Player of the Season and Player of the Season for 2021–22.

On 29 January 2023 he joined Luton Town on loan for the remainder of the 2022-23 season.

International career
He has represented England at under-18 and under-20 level. Drameh also qualifies for Gambia through his parents. In October 2020 Drameh was called up to the Gambia senior squad.

On 16 November 2021, Drameh made his England under-21 debut during a 3–2 defeat to Georgia in Batumi.

Career statistics

Honours
Individual

 Cardiff City Player of the Season & Young Player of the Season: 2021–22

References

2001 births
Living people
English footballers
England youth international footballers
Fulham F.C. players
Leeds United F.C. players
Cardiff City F.C. players
Luton Town F.C. players
Association football fullbacks
English people of Gambian descent
Black British sportspeople
Premier League players
England under-21 international footballers